Hors is a Slavic deity.

Hors may also refer to:
 Hors, Armenia, a village
 , a river in Armenia

See also 
 
 Hors catégorie, a term in bicycle racing
 Horse (disambiguation)
 Hor (disambiguation)
 Khors (disambiguation)